Avenir Foot Lozère is a French football club located in Mende, France. It plays in Regional 1, Occitanie, being relegated from Championnat National 3 in 2019 after three seasons in the division. The team's colours are blue and yellow.

References

External links
 

Association football clubs established in 1920
AF Lozere
Sport in Lozère
Football clubs in Occitania (administrative region)